Alexander Pavlovich Gorchilin (born March 3, 1992) is a Russian film and stage actor, voice actor and film director.
Gained fame after playing roles in the TV series Daddy's Daughters and Atlantis (ru). Actor of the Gogol Center Theater. In 2018, he made his debut as a film director, presenting the full-length picture Acid.

Biography
Alexander Gorchilin began acting as a child. He played a role in the musical Nord-Ost and then in commercials and TV-series. In 2012 he graduated from the Moscow Art Theatre School (the course of Kirill Serebrennikov) and joined the troupe of Gogol Center.

Acting career
He continued his film career, among his most notable roles are Antonin in Yes and yes by Valeriya Gai Germanika, Grigoriy Zaytsev in The Student, and Punk in Leto by Kirill Serebrennikov.

In 2018 Gorchilin made his debut as a filmmaker with his first feature film Acid. He received a "Debut" prize at the 29th Kinotavr film festival.

Filmography

Film

Television

As director
 Acid (2018)

Dubbing roles
 Phineas Flynn (Phineas and Ferb)
 Ferb Fletcher (Phineas and Ferb)
 Jackson Stewart (Hannah Montana)

References

External links
 

1992 births
Living people
Russian male child actors
Russian male film actors
Russian male voice actors
Russian male television actors
21st-century Russian male actors
Russian film directors
Moscow Art Theatre School alumni
Male actors from Moscow